Graceless may refer to:

Graceless (Sulk album)
Graceless, English marketing name of 2003 Shino Lin album Bùzhī hǎodǎi 
"Graceless", 2013 song by The National (band) from the album Trouble Will Find Me
"Graceless", song by The Damnwells from Air Stereo 2006
"Graceless", song by The Crayon Fields
Graceless (Big Finish series), an audio play series by Big Finish Productions
Graceless, the original name of the protagonist Christian in The Pilgrim's Progress.